The Independent Party of Florida is a political third party formed in the 1990s.  It was among several parties disqualified by the Florida Secretary of State in 2017, but it successfully refiled several months later. At their peak, the Independent Party was one of the largest political third parties in Florida by member count, only behind the Republicans and the Democrats.

References

External links 
 Independent Party of Florida
 Ballotpedia page

Political parties established in 1993
Political parties in Florida
Political parties disestablished in 2017
Political parties established in 2017